Pipizella virens is a species of hoverfly, from the family Syrphidae, in the order Diptera.

References

Diptera of Europe
Pipizinae
Insects described in 1805
Taxa named by Johan Christian Fabricius